The Universidad Distrital Francisco José de Caldas is a public, coeducational, research university based in Bogotá, Colombia.  It is the second most important public higher education institution in the city, after the National University of Colombia, with a population of 26,140 students.  It was founded in 1948, by Priest Daniel de Caicedo, who would become its first rector, with the support of the Bogotá City Council, as the Municipal University of Bogotá.  It changed its name to the current in 1957 when the municipality of Bogotá became a district.  Its establishment was officialized by the 1970 decree No. 1030, issued by the national government.  The university offers 70 programs at undergraduate and postgraduate levels, including four masters and one doctorate.

The university is member of the Association of Colombian Universities (ASCUN), the Iberoamerican Association of Postgraduate Universities (AUIP), and the Iberoamerican University Network Universia.

History
 The Francisco José de Caldas District University was founded in 1948, on initiative of the priest Daniel de Caicedo, who was its first principal. The foundation act of the "Universidad Municipal de Bogotá" (as it was originally named) stated that it was a university created by the Bogotá City Council.

The first program to be created was Radiotechnology, which in time became the Electronics Engineering program.  The other program was Topography which still exists and gave birth to the Cadastral Engineering program.  Another program was dedicated to the care and conservation of the environment, later named Forest Engineering.

The first university building was located where today stands the Museo de Desarrollo Urbano (Urban Development Museum) in the Calle tenth with Carrera eighth, in front of the Palacio Liévano (Liévano Palace) and the Capitolio Nacional (National Capitol).

In 1957, the city of Bogotá became the "Distrito Especial" (Special District) and the university was then named "Universidad Distrital Francisco José de Caldas" after the first Colombian scientist Francisco José de Caldas.

In the 1970s the departments of Physics and Chemistry were created. In 1979 due to political and organizational difficulties, the university was closed for two years and reopened, with a newly constructed campus, in the neighborhood La Macarena.

Between the years 1993 and 1994,  the Environment and Natural Resources programs were created.

Campus
It is constituted by buildings and campus around the Bogotá city
 Science and Education campus, formerly named 'La Macarena'
 Faculty of Engineering - Sabio Caldas Building
 Alejandro Suárez Copete Building
 Technological Faculty campus
 Faculty of Art - ASAB campus
 Faculty of Environment and Natural Resources campus.

Departments
Faculty of Engineering
 Faculty of Science and Education
 Environment Faculty
 Faculty of Art - ASAB
 Technological Faculty
 Language Institute -ILUD
 Accreditation Committee
 Educational Study and Research Institute

See also

 List of universities in Colombia

Notes

External links
Francisco José de Caldas District University official website 

Universities and colleges in Colombia
Educational institutions established in 1948
Universities and colleges in Bogotá
1948 establishments in Colombia